King Block may refer to:

King Block (American football) (1929–2014), American football coach
King Block (New Brunswick, New Jersey), listed on the National Register of Historic Places in Middlesex County, New Jersey
King Block (Barton, Vermont), listed on the National Register of Historic Places in Orleans County, Vermont